The 1959 DFB-Pokal Final decided the winner of the 1958–59 DFB-Pokal, the 16th season of Germany's knockout football cup competition. It was played on 27 December 1959 at the Auestadion in Kassel. Schwarz-Weiß Essen won the match 5–2 against Borussia Neunkirchen, to claim their 1st cup title.

Route to the final
The DFB-Pokal began with 5 teams in a single-elimination knockout cup competition. There were a total of two rounds leading up to the final. In the qualification round, all but two teams were given a bye. Teams were drawn against each other, and the winner after 90 minutes would advance. If still tied, 30 minutes of extra time was played. If the score was still level, a replay would take place at the original away team's stadium. If still level after 90 minutes, 30 minutes of extra time was played. If the score was still level, a drawing of lots would decide who would advance to the next round.

Note: In all results below, the score of the finalist is given first (H: home; A: away).

Match

Details

References

External links
 Match report at kicker.de 
 Match report at WorldFootball.net
 Match report at Fussballdaten.de 

Schwarz-Weiß Essen matches
Borussia Neunkirchen matches
1958–59 in German football cups
1959
Sport in Kassel
20th century in Kassel
December 1959 sports events in Europe